George Hancock (1849- 1924) was an architect active in North Dakota, Montana and Minnesota.

Biography
George David Hancock was born in  Gloucestershire, England. He was educated at  South  Kensington  Institute in  London,  England.  He moved to  Dakota  Territory   in 1882, settling in Fargo, North Dakota with his brother Walter Benjamin Hancock  (1863-1929), when they were 33 and 17, respectively.
Walter Hancock attended Syracuse University where he graduated with a degree in architecture in 1889.

 

After a fire destroyed much of Downtown Fargo in 1893, George and Walter designed around half of the replacement buildings. After advocating for a 1917 law requiring architects in North Dakota to be licensed, he and Walter became the first two licensed architects in the state. The  firm of Hancock Brothers to also operated open a branch office at Bozeman, Montana.

Notable works
Many of their works are listed on the U.S. National Register of Historic Places, with credit individually or as Hancock Brothers or variations.  Their works include:
Christ Episcopal Church and Rectory (Sheridan, Montana), SW jct. of Poppleton and Main Sts., Sheridan, Montana (Hancock, George) NRHP-listed
Episcopal Church of the Advent-Guild Hall, 501 6th St. E., Devil's Lake, North Dakota (Hancock, George) NRHP-listed
Gallatin County High School, 404 W. Main, Bozeman, Montana (Hancock, George) NRHP-listed
Grace Episcopal Church, 210 C Ave. S., Minnewaukan, ND (Hancock Brothers) NRHP-listed
Grace Episcopal Church, Jct. of 2nd Ave. NE. and 4th St. NE., NW corner, Jamestown, ND (Hancock, George) NRHP-listed
Hotel Kaddatz, 111-113 W. Lincoln Ave., Fergus Falls, MN (Hancock, George) NRHP-listed
One or more properties in Jamestown Historic District, Roughly bounded by First St., Fourth Ave., SE, Fifth St., and Second Ave., Jamestown, ND (Hancock Bros.) NRHP-listed
McHench Building, listed on the NRHP as part of Knerr Block, Floyd Block, McHench Building and Webster and Coe Building, 13, 15, 17-19, and 21-23 8th St., S., Fargo, ND (Hancock Brothers) NRHP-listed
McLean County Courthouse, Fifth Ave., Washburn, ND (Hancock Bros.) NRHP-listed
North Side Fargo High Style Residential Historic District, Roughly bounded by Twelfth Ave. N, Fourth St., Eleventh Ave. N, and Seventh St., Fargo, ND (Hancock, Walter & George) NRHP-listed
Old Stone Church, 206 N Wilcox Ave., Buffalo, ND (Hancock, George) NRHP-listed
Park Elementary School, 121 6th Ave. South, Moorhead, MN (Hancock Bros.) NRHP-listed
Powers Hotel, 400 Broadway, Fargo, ND (Hancock Brothers & Kurke William) NRHP-listed
Elliot-Powers House and Garage
St. James Catholic Church, 622 1st Ave., S., Jamestown, ND (Hancock Brothers) NRHP-listed
St. James Episcopal Church and Rectory, 9 W. Olive, Bozeman, Montana (Hancock, George) NRHP-listed
Seiler Building, 110 First St. E, Jamestown, ND (Hancock, George & Walter) NRHP-listed
St. Mary's Academy, E. 7th St., Devils Lake, ND (Hancock Brothers) NRHP-listed
St. Michael's Church, 520 N. Sixth St., Grand Forks, ND (Hancock Bros.) NRHP-listed
St. Michael's Hospital and Nurses' Residence, 813 Lewis Blvd., Grand Forks, ND (Hancock, George) NRHP-listed
St. Stephen's Episcopal Church, Jct. of 3rd Ave. and 5th St., SE corner, Casselton, ND (Hancock, George) NRHP-listed
State Normal School at Valley City Historic District, Roughly bounded by College St., SE., Second Ave., SE., Viking Dr. and Second Ave., SW., Valley City, ND (Hancock Brothers) NRHP-listed
Hannah C. and Peter E. Thompson House, 361 Second St., NE., Barnesville, MN (Hancock, Walter B., and Hancock, George) NRHP-listed

References

19th-century American architects
1849 births
1924 deaths
Architects from Gloucestershire
People from Fargo, North Dakota
Architects from North Dakota
20th-century American architects